Atomic Homefront is a 2017 documentary film about the effects of radioactive waste stored in West Lake Landfill in St. Louis County, Missouri.

References

External links
 

2017 documentary films
2017 films
Environmental impact of nuclear power
Hazardous waste
Radioactive waste
Radioactivity
St. Louis County, Missouri
HBO documentary films
2010s English-language films
2010s American films